The 1960 SANFL Grand Final was an Australian rules football competition. North Adelaide beat  95 to 90. North Adelaide won by 5 points. 
Norwood had led by 8 points late in the last quarter before North scored 3 goals 1 behind in 5 minutes to take an 11 point lead into time on. Norwood scored a late goal but North then held the ball in their forward lines until the siren sounded just as Norwood were streaming out of defence.

Teams

References 

SANFL Grand Finals
SANFL Grand Final, 1960

Barry Potts kicked 7 from a forward pocket